Stephen E. Burgio (December 23, 1912 – November 28, 2001) from Queens, New York was a former New York Supreme Court Justice, criminal defense attorney, and assistant to Chief Prosecutor Supreme Court Justice Robert H. Jackson during the Nuremberg Trials. Judge Burgio was also a United States Army Captain in World War II.

Judge Burgio was also president of the Bayside Republican Club in New York while a member of the bench.  He retired and moved to California, where he died at the age of 89.  He is buried at the Riverside National Cemetery in Riverside, California.

External links
 

1912 births
2001 deaths
United States Army personnel of World War II
New York Supreme Court Justices
People from Queens, New York
Burials at Riverside National Cemetery
20th-century American judges
United States Army officers